Lars Helsvik is a Swedish sprint canoeist who competed in the late 1940s.

Career
In 1948, Helsvik won a gold medal in the K-1 4 x 500 m event at the London ICF Canoe Spring World Championships. This event was separate from other canoeing competitions at the 1948 Summer Olympics in London. The K-1 4 x 500 m event was only held once at the 1960 Games in Rome.

References

Living people
Swedish male canoeists
Year of birth missing (living people)
ICF Canoe Sprint World Championships medalists in kayak